Mel & Joey is a Philippine television lifestyle talk show broadcast by GMA Network. Hosted Mel Tiangco and Joey de Leon, it premiered on August 1, 2004, replacing Partners with Mel Tiangco. The show concluded on July 17, 2011, with a total of 360 episodes. It was replaced by Mind Master in its timeslot.

Its last studio-based episode was aired on February 13, 2011. Afterwards, the show has been taped at a designated venue. The last episode was titled as "Happy Ending".

Segments

 Balitaktakan
 Syeteng Syete ni Joey
 Hanepbahay
 One-on-One with Mel
 Collection
 Negosikat
 Babala

Ratings
According to AGB Nielsen Philippines' Mega Manila household television ratings, the final episode of Mel & Joey scored an 18.9% rating.

Accolades

References

External links
 

2004 Philippine television series debuts
2011 Philippine television series endings
Filipino-language television shows
GMA Network original programming
Philippine television talk shows